This is a list of all recordings released by British gothic rock band the Mission (known as the Mission UK in the US for legal reasons).

Albums

Studio albums

Live albums

Compilation albums

Box sets

Video albums

EPs

Singles

Notes

References

External links
Official Mission website

Discographies of British artists
Rock music group discographies